Monroe County Schools is the operating school district within Monroe County, West Virginia. It is governed by the Monroe County Board of Education.

Schools

High schools
James Monroe High School 
Monroe County Vocational/Technical Center

Middle schools
Mountain View Elementary & Middle School 
Peterstown Middle School

Elementary schools
Peterstown Elementary School

External links
Monroe County Schools

School districts in West Virginia
Education in Monroe County, West Virginia